The Shire of Walpeup was a local government area in northwestern Victoria, Australia, along the South Australian border.

History

Walpeup was incorporated as a shire on 1 November 1911, created out of parts of the Shires of Mildura, Swan Hill, Lawloit, Lowan, Dimboola and Karkarooc.

On 20 January 1995, the Shire of Walpeup was abolished, and along with the City of Mildura and the Shire of Mildura, was merged into the newly created Rural City of Mildura.

Ridings

The Shire of Walpeup was divided into four ridings in 1986, each of which elected three councillors:
 Ouyen East Riding
 Ouyen West Riding
 Walpeup/Underbool Riding
 Murrayville Riding

Towns and localities
 Big Desert
 Cowangie
 Kattyoong
 Kiamal
 Koonda
 Kulwin
 Mittyack
 Murrayville
 Murray-Sunset (shared with the Shire of Mildura)
 Ngallo
 Ouyen*
 Panitya
 Tiega
 Underbool
 Walpeup
 Wyperfeld National Park (shared with the Shire of Dimboola)

* Council seat.

Population

* Estimate in the 1958 Victorian Year Book.

References

External links
 Victorian Places - Walpeup Shire

Walpeup